Mount Vernon is a city in Grant County, Oregon, United States. Its post office was established in 1877 and named after a black stallion that belonged to settler David W. Jenkins. The population had grown to 451 by the 1950 census. There are a few motels and restaurants in Mount Vernon. The population was 527 at the 2010 census.

Geography

Demographics

2010 census
As of the census of 2010, there were 527 people, 259 households, and 151 families residing in the city. The racial makeup of the city was 95.4% White, 0.2% Native American, 0.2% Asian, 1.7% from other races, and 2.5% from two or more races. Hispanic or Latino of any race were 3.0% of the population.

There were 259 households, of which 21.2% had children under the age of 18 living with them, 44.4% were married couples living together, 9.7% had a female householder with no husband present, 4.2% had a male householder with no wife present, and 41.7% were non-families. 34.7% of all households were made up of individuals, and 18.1% had someone living alone who was 65 years of age or older. The average household size was 2.03 and the average family size was 2.61.

The median age in the city was 49 years. 19.7% of residents were under the age of 18; 4.1% were between the ages of 18 and 24; 20.1% were from 25 to 44; 33.9% were from 45 to 64; and 22.2% were 65 years of age or older. The gender makeup of the city was 49.7% male and 50.3% female.

2000 census
As of the census of 2000, there were 595 people, 248 households, and 162 families residing in the city. The population density was 856.1 people per square mile (332.9/km). There were 270 housing units at an average density of 388.5 per square mile (151.1/km). The racial makeup of the city was 94.29% White, 0.17% African American, 1.85% Native American, and 3.70% from two or more races. Hispanic or Latino of any race were 2.18% of the population.

There were 248 households, out of which 31.0% had children under the age of 18 living with them, 51.6% were married couples living together, 11.3% had a female householder with no husband present, and 34.3% were non-families. 29.4% of all households were made up of individuals, and 12.5% had someone living alone who was 65 years of age or older. The average household size was 2.40 and the average family size was 2.97.

In the city, the population was spread out, with 28.2% under the age of 18, 6.7% from 18 to 24, 26.9% from 25 to 44, 24.5% from 45 to 64, and 13.6% who were 65 years of age or older. The median age was 38 years. For every 100 females, there were 90.7 males. For every 100 females age 18 and over, there were 83.3 males.

The median income for a household in the city was $31,635, and the median income for a family was $32,083. Males had a median income of $33,611 versus $17,292 for females. The per capita income for the city was $13,241. About 13.7% of families and 13.8% of the population were below the poverty line, including 21.5% of those under age 18 and 3.1% of those age 65 or over.

References

External links

 Grant County Chamber of Commerce entry for Mt. Vernon
 Listing for Mt. Vernon in the Oregon Blue Book

Cities in Oregon
Cities in Grant County, Oregon
1948 establishments in Oregon